Snow Farm is a ski area near Wānaka, New Zealand, dedicated to cross-country skiing.

Description
Snow Farm features 55 km of trails, and the conference centre has accommodation for about 60 people. It is located on the Pisa range close to Cardrona, at an altitude of approx 1,600 m. The area is used for cross country skiing in the winter and during the summer months for altitude training with trails climbing out to 2000m. The proximity of Wānaka (275m) and Queenstown (310m) and the training options around these two towns makes the Snow Farm one of the best locations in the Southern Hemisphere for a live high, train low training regime.

The Lodge itself is a wedding, conference and meeting venue with seating for 150 people, a private bar, restaurant, and viewing deck; with accommodation options. Private hire options are popular amongst the conference organisers along with the breakout activities onsite including: Cross Country skiing, snow shoeing, Husky dog sled tours, and a snow and ice driving experience. During the summer months, mountain biking, hiking, orienteering, rock climbing and adventure racing are available.

It is also the location of the Southern Hemisphere Proving Grounds. The series of twelve vehicle test facilities are used by car manufacturers from around the world for ice and snow testing during the northern-hemisphere summer.

Access
Snow Farm is around 55 km from Queenstown and 35 km from Wanaka. The 13 km gravel access road is used for the internationally known Race to the Sky hillclimb.

Merino Muster
An annual cross country skiing event called the Merino Muster is held in September and covers distances of 42 km/21 km/7 km and 1 km for children.

References

External links
 Official website
 Lodge website
 Merino Muster website
 Southern Hemisphere Proving Grounds New Zealand

Ski areas and resorts in Otago
Wānaka